The 2019–20 NBL season was the 39th season for the Perth Wildcats in the NBL.

Roster

Depth chart

Preseason 
The Wildcats pre-season included 4 regular pre-season games and 2 NBL Blitz games. Their first three games were held in Perth against the Adelaide 36ers. As a club in the NBL they also took part in the NBL Blitz and played games against the Illawarra Hawks and Melbourne United, which was followed by another pre-season game in Melbourne against Melbourne United. They decided to opt out of the NBLxNBA games in the United States.

Ladder

Game log 

|- style="background-color:#ffcccc;"
| 1
| 4 September
| Adelaide 36ers
| L 84-90
| Bryce Cotton (23)
| Rhys Vague (8)
| Bryce Cotton (6)
| Mandurah Aquatic & Recreation Centre
| 0-1
|- style="background-color:#ccffcc;"
| 2
| 6 September
| Adelaide 36ers
| W 100-98
| Rhys Vague (20)
| Rhys Vague (7)
| Damian Martin (6)
| South West Sports Centre
| 1-1
|- style="background-color:#ffcccc;"
| 3
| 8 September
| Adelaide 36ers
| L 77-83
| Rhys Vague (16)
| Majok Majok (8)
| Mitchell Norton (6)
| HBF Arena
| 1-2

|- style="background-color:#ffcccc;"
| 1
| 20 September
| Illawarra Hawks
| L 122-119
| Bryce Cotton (27)
| Bryce Cotton (6)
| Bryce Cotton (8)
| Kingborough Sports Centre
| 0-1
|- style="background-color:#ffcccc;"
| 2
| 22 September
| Melbourne United
| L 71-103
| Clint Steindl (17)
| Majok Majok (12)
| Clint Steindl (4)
| Derwent Entertainment Centre
| 0-2

|- style="background-color:#ccffcc;"
| 4
| 25 September
| @ Melbourne United
| W 90-92
| Nick Kay (21)
| Nic Pozoglou (9)
| Bryce Cotton, Dario Hunt (6)
| Geelong Arena
| 2-2
|- style="background-color:#ffcccc;"
| 5
| 27 September
| @ Brisbane Bullets
| L 85-82
| Clint Steindl (17)
| Hunt, Kay, Majok (7)
| Bryce Cotton, Damian Martin (3)
| University of the Sunshine Coast
| 2-3

Regular season

Ladder

Game log 
The regular season of the NBL consists of 28 games, with the Wildcats' 14 home games to be played at RAC Arena.

|- style="background-color:#ccffcc;"
| 1
| 5 October
| Melbourne United
| W 94-93
| Bryce Cotton (21)
| Nick Kay (8)
| Nick Kay (7)
| RAC Arena 
| 1-0
|- style="background-color:#ccffcc;"
| 2
| 11 October
| Illawarra Hawks
| W 103-76
| Bryce Cotton (28)
| Dario Hunt (10)
| Bryce Cotton (7)
| RAC Arena
| 2-0
|- style="background-color:#ffcccc;"
| 3
| 18 October
| Cairns Taipans
| L 76-99
| Nick Kay, Terrico White (15)
| Dario Hunt (8)
| Damian Martin (6)
| RAC Arena
| 2-1
|- style="background-color:#ccffcc;"
| 4
| 20 October
| @ Melbourne United
| W 93-95
| Bryce Cotton (28)
| Nick Kay (8)
| Dario Hunt (7)
| Melbourne Arena
| 3-1
|- style="background-color:#ccffcc;"
| 5
| 25 October
| South East Melbourne Phoenix
| W 110-79
| Terrico White (17)
| Nick Kay (13)
| Bryce Cotton (8)
| RAC Arena
| 4-1
|- style="background-color:#ccffcc;"
| 6
| 27 October
| @ Illawarra Hawks
| W 76-81
| Bryce Cotton (21)
| Damian Martin (10)
| Bryce Cotton, Damian Martin (4)
| WIN Entertainment Centre
| 5-1

|- style="background-color:#ffcccc;"
| 7
| 1 November
| @ Brisbane Bullets
| L 87-78
| Terrico White (23)
| Nick Kay (9)
| Damian Martin (4)
| Nissan Arena
| 5-2
|- style="background-color:#ccffcc;"
| 8
| 3 November
| @ New Zealand Breakers
| W 79-84
| Dario Hunt (21)
| Dario Hunt (11)
| Bryce Cotton (7)
| iLT Stadium Southland
| 6-2
|- style="background-color:#ffcccc;"
| 9
| 10 November
| @ Sydney Kings
| L 104-85
| Bryce Cotton (36)
| Dario Hunt (10)
| Bryce Cotton, Dario Hunt (3)
| Qudos Bank Arena
| 6-3
|- style="background-color:#ccffcc;"
| 10
| 15 November
| @ Adelaide 36ers
| W 95-99
| Nick Kay (21)
| Nick Kay, Dario Hunt (8)
| Nick Kay (5)
| Adelaide Entertainment Centre
| 7-3
|- style="background-color:#ccffcc;"
| 11
| 17 November
| New Zealand Breakers
| W 88-77
| Bryce Cotton (34)
| Nick Kay (8)
| Damian Martin, Terrico White (5)
| RAC Arena
| 8-3
|- style="background-color:#ffcccc;"
| 12
| 23 November
| @ Cairns Taipans
| L 91-84
| Clint Steindl 17
| Damian Martin 5
| Nick Kay, Damian Martin 4
| Cairns Convention Centre
| 8-4

|- style="background-color:#ffcccc;"
| 13
| 1 December
| Adelaide 36ers
| L 88-99
| Bryce Cotton (18)
| Jesse Wagstaff (6)
| Kay, Travers, Wagstaff (4)
| RAC Arena
| 8-5
|- style="background-color:#ccffcc;"
| 14
| 6 December
| Sydney Kings
| W 96-77
| Bryce Cotton (27)
| Nick Kay (13)
| Bryce Cotton (4)
| RAC Arena
| 9-5
|- style="background-color:#ccffcc;"
| 15
| 8 December
| @ South East Melbourne Phoenix
| W 98-108
| Bryce Cotton (26)
| Nick Kay (12)
| Damian Martin, Jesse Wagstaff (4)
| Melbourne Arena
| 10-5
|- style="background-color:#ccffcc;"
| 16
| 12 December
| @ Cairns Taipans
| W 84-88
| Bryce Cotton (24)
| Nick Kay (11)
| Nick Kay (5)
| Cairns Convention Centre
| 11-5
|- style="background-color:#ccffcc;"
| 17
| 14 December
| Brisbane Bullets
| W 86-78
| Bryce Cotton (23)
| Damien Martin (8)
| Mitch Norton (3)
| RAC Arena
| 12-5
|- style="background-color:#ffcccc;"
| 18
| 21 December
| Melbourne United
| L 74-87
| Bryce Cotton (15)
| Nick Kay (5)
| Cotton, Martin, White (3)
| RAC Arena
| 12-6
|- style="background-color:#ccffcc;"
| 19
| 28 December
| @ Sydney Kings
| W 85-98
| Bryce Cotton (39)
| Nick Kay (10)
| Dario Hunt (4)
| Qudos Bank Arena
| 13-6

|- style="background-color:#ffcccc;"
| 20
| 1 January
| @ Adelaide 36ers
| L 100-97
| Bryce Cotton (22)
| Majok Majok (10)
| Bryce Cotton (4)
| Adelaide Entertainment Centre
| 13-7
|- style="background-color:#ffcccc;"
| 21
| 5 January
| @ Brisbane Bullets
| L 97-85
| Bryce Cotton (24)
| Bryce Cotton (6)
| Nick Kay (4)
| Nissan Arena
| 13-8
|- style="background-color:#ccffcc;"
| 22
| 10 January
| @ Illawarra Hawks
| W 77-99
| Bryce Cotton (23)
| Nick Kay (10)
| Bryce Cotton (6)
| WIN Entertainment Centre
| 14-8
|- style="background-color:#ccffcc;"
| 23
| 17 January
| South East Melbourne Phoenix
| W 97-71
| Bryce Cotton (25)
| Majok Majok (10)
| Bryce Cotton (7)
| RAC Arena
| 15-8
|- style="background-color:#ccffcc;"
| 24
| 25 January
| New Zealand Breakers
| W 90-89
| Bryce Cotton, Miles Plumlee (23)
| Miles Plumlee (17)
| Bryce Cotton, Mitch Norton (4)
| RAC Arena
| 16-8
|- style="background-color:#ffcccc;"
| 25
| 29 January
| @ Melbourne United
| L 77-67
| Nick Kay (23)
| Nick Kay (8)
| Mitch Norton (4)
| Melbourne Arena
| 16-9

|- style="background-color:#ccffcc;"
| 26
| 1 February
| Sydney Kings
| W 110-100
| Bryce Cotton (30)
| Nick Kay (10)
| Mitch Norton (5)
| RAC Arena
| 17-9
|- style="background-color:#ccffcc;"
| 27
| 7 February
| Brisbane Bullets
| W 85-72
| Bryce Cotton (25)
| Nick Kay (8)
| Bryce Cotton, Nick Kay (5)
| RAC Arena
| 18-9
|- style="background-color:#ccffcc;"
| 28
| 14 February
| Adelaide 36ers
| W 94-79
| Nick Kay (23)
| Mitch Norton (8)
| Mitch Norton (5)
| RAC Arena
| 19-9

Postseason

|- style="background-color:#ccffcc;"
| 1
| 28 February
| Cairns Taipans
| W 108-107
| Bryce Cotton (42)
| Nick Kay (9)
| Bryce Cotton, Nick Kay (6)
| RAC Arena
| 1-0
|- style="background-color:#ffcccc;"
| 2
| 1 March
| @ Cairns Taipans
| L 85-74
| Clint Steindl (18)
| Nick Kay (10)
| Nick Kay (4)
| Cairns Convention Centre
| 1-1
|- style="background-color:#ccffcc;"
| 3
| 5 March
| Cairns Taipans
| W 93-82
| Terrico White (26)
| Nick Kay (12)
| Bryce Cotton (8)
| RAC Arena
| 2-1

|- style="background-color:#ccffcc;"
| 1
| 8 March
| @ Sydney Kings
| W 86-88
| Bryce Cotton (32)
| Miles Plumlee (7)
| Bryce Cotton, Mitch Norton (4)
| Qudos Bank Arena
| 1-0
|- style="background-color:#ffcccc;"
| 2
| 13 March
| Sydney Kings
| L 85-97
| Bryce Cotton 27
| Miles Plumlee 8
| Bryce Cotton, Mitch Norton 3
| RAC Arena
| 1-1
|- style="background-color:#ccffcc;"
| 3
| 15 March
| @ Sydney Kings
| W 96-111
| Bryce Cotton (31)
| Nick Kay (12)
| Bryce Cotton (7)
| Qudos Bank Arena
| 2-1

Awards

Player of the Week 
Round 2, Bryce Cotton

Round 10, Nick Kay

Round 17, Miles Plumlee

Round 18, Nick Kay

See also 

 2019–20 NBL season
 Perth Wildcats

References

External links 

 Official Website

Perth Wildcats season
Perth Wildcats seasons
Perth Wildcats season